Floris Osmond (10 March 1849 – 18 June 1912) was a French scientist and engineer. He is known as one of the originators of metallography. He named several phases that occur in iron and steel microstructures such as martensite, after A. Martens, and cementite. A list of publications was published shortly after his death.

References

External links 
 
 

Scientists from Paris
French engineers
1849 births
1912 deaths
Bessemer Gold Medal